Great Blue Heron is an outdoor 2012 sculpture by Jud Turner, installed at the intersection of East 13th Avenue and Alder Street in Eugene, Oregon, in the United States. The  sculpture is made of fifty percent recycled materials and fifty percent new steel. It was unveiled on October 18, 2012, two days before Eugene's 150th birthday. The work was commissioned by The Duck Store, the University of Oregon, and the City of Eugene.

See also

 2012 in art

References

External links
Great Blue Heron for the City of Eugene at Jud Turner's official website
 

2012 establishments in Oregon
2012 sculptures
Sculptures of birds in Oregon
Outdoor sculptures in Eugene, Oregon
Statues in Eugene, Oregon
Steel sculptures in Oregon